Theta Canis Majoris (θ Canis Majoris) is a solitary, orange-hued star near the northern edge of the constellation Canis Major, forming the nose of the "dog". The star is visible to the naked eye with an apparent visual magnitude of 4.08. Based upon an annual parallax shift of 12.51 mas as seen from Earth, it is located about 260 light years from the Sun. The star is moving away from us with a radial velocity of +96.2 km/s.

This is an old, evolved K-type giant star with a stellar classification of K4 III. It is about ten billion years old with 0.95 times the mass of the Sun, but has expanded to 32 times the Sun's radius. The star is radiating 263 times the Sun's luminosity from its photosphere at an effective temperature of 4,145 K.

References

K-type giants
Canis Majoris, Theta
Canis Major
Durchmusterung objects
Canis Majoris, 14
050778
033160
2574